Royton was, from 1918 to 1950, a parliamentary constituency of the United Kingdom, centred on Royton in North West England.  It returned one Member of Parliament (MP) to the House of Commons of the Parliament of the United Kingdom, elected by the first past the post system.

History

The constituency was created for the 1918 general election, and abolished for the 1950 general election.

Boundaries 
The Urban Districts of Crompton, Littleborough, Milnrow, Norden, Royton, Wardle, and Whitworth.

Members of Parliament

Election results

Elections in the 1910s

Elections in the 1920s

Elections in the 1930s

Elections in the 1940s 
General Election 1939–40:
Another General Election was required to take place before the end of 1940. The political parties had been making preparations for an election to take place from 1939 and by the end of this year, the following candidates had been selected; 
Conservative: Harold Sutcliffe
Liberal: Mayne Knight

References
Craig, F. W. S. (1983). British parliamentary election results 1918-1949 (3 ed.). Chichester: Parliamentary Research Services. .

Parliamentary constituencies in North West England (historic)
Constituencies of the Parliament of the United Kingdom established in 1918
Constituencies of the Parliament of the United Kingdom disestablished in 1950
Politics of the Metropolitan Borough of Oldham